Joseph Rosenblum Bennett (July 2, 1900 – July 11, 1987) was a Major League Baseball third baseman. Bennett played for the Philadelphia Phillies in the  season. Bennett played in one career game, on July 5, 1923. He batted and threw right-handed. Bennett attended MU and NYU.

Bennett was born in New York, New York and died in Morro Bay, California, and was Jewish.

References

External links
Baseball Reference.com page

1900 births
1987 deaths
Philadelphia Phillies players
Major League Baseball third basemen
Baseball players from New York (state)
NYU Violets baseball players
University of Missouri alumni
Jewish American baseball players
Jewish Major League Baseball players
20th-century American Jews